The Little Ossipee River is a  tributary of the Saco River in southwestern Maine, USA.

It rises at the outlet of Balch Pond in the town of Newfield and flows east, passing through Shapleigh Pond and flowing past the village of North Shapleigh. Forming the boundary between Newfield and the town of Shapleigh, the river flows northeast, then reenters Newfield, passing the town center. Turning east, the river becomes the boundary between the towns of Limerick (to the north) and Waterboro (to the south). It passes through Lake Arrowhead, a reservoir with a surrounding lakeside community, then continues northeast and north into the town of Limington, where it joins the Saco near the village of East Limington.

See also
 List of rivers of Maine

References

 
 Maine Streamflow Data from the USGS
 Maine Watershed Data From Environmental Protection Agency

Rivers of York County, Maine
Saco River
Rivers of Maine